The Kingdom of Bajhang was a petty kingdom in the confederation of 24 states known as Chaubisi Rajya. The kingdom was established in 1503 BS. The kingdom was ruled by 61 kings.

In 1848 BS, the kingdom was annexed to the Kingdom of Nepal, however, the royals of Bajhang were given special status. This changed in 2017 BS when the democratic government of Nepal passed an act to not recognize any of such status. The prince of Bajhang, Om Jung, at the time was unsatisfied and appealed in court against the act, but he could not succeed to revert the act. Instead, he started to make his own army to fight against the Nepal government. In the same year, the rebellion movement of Om Jung caused a fight with Nepal police in which 150 were injured. Omjung flee to India to collect more arms and army. Later, Omjung was killed in an army operation in Bajhang district.

Kings of Bajhang

Following are the list of kings of Bajhang 
 Rai Jaimala Phatta (राई जइमला फट्टा)
 Rai Sangram Phatta (राई संग्राम फट्टा)
 Chuni Rai(चुनी राई)
 Pratap Dev Rai(प्रतापदेव राई)
 Nari Bam Bajhang(नरी बम बझाङ))
 Raja Bam Bajhang (राजा बम बझाङ)
 Shree Bam (श्री बम)
 Jayati Bam Bajahang(जयाती बम बझाङ)
 Malai Bam Bajhang(मलाई बम बझाङ)
 Shakti Singh(शक्ति सिंह) (died in 1408)
 Jakti Singh (जक्ति सिंह) 
Sujan Singh(सुजन सिंह) (1408-1415)
 Sahu Singh(शाहु सिंह) बझाङ (1414-1446)
 Bhew Singh (भ्यु सिंह) बझाङ, (1446)
 Prithvi Singh(पृथ्वी सिंह) (1535)
 Ratan Singh (रतन सिंह)
 Dungur Singh (डुंगरा सिंह)
 Jitari Singh (1534-1569)
 Madheni Singh
 Indra Singh (इन्द्र सिंह) (died in 1569)
 Rajkmar Bijay Singh 
 Bhairab Singh (भैरब सिंह)(1569-1606)
 Rajkumar Mukti Singh 
 Dilip Singh (1606-1641)
 Mahendra Singh (Died in 1641)
 Rajkumar Gugu Singh (राजकुमार गगु सिंह)
 Rajkumar Birbhadra Singh (राजकुमार वीरभद्र सिंह)
 Prighvi Singh (पृथ्वी सिंह)(Died in 1641)
 Ratan Singh (रतन सिंह)(died in 1671)
 Kalyan Singh (कल्याण सिंह)(1679-1688)
 Amar Singh (अमर सिंह)(1688-1730)
 Samundar Singh (समुन्द्र सिंह) (1730-1804)
 Raghunath Singh (1804-1807)
 Indra Singh (इन्द्र सिंह) (1807-1812)

References 

Chaubisi Rajya
Former countries in South Asia
Bajhang
History of Nepal
B